More than Honey is a 2012 Swiss documentary film directed by Markus Imhoof about honeybee colonies in California, Switzerland, China and Austria. The film was submitted for the Oscar for Best Foreign Language Film at the 86th Academy Awards, but it was not nominated.

Cast
 Fred Jaggi
 Prof. Dr. 
 John Miller
 Liane Singer
 Heidrun Singer
 Zhao Su Zhang
 Fred Terry
 Prof. Dr. Boris Baer
 Elisabeth Schild

Reception
Bumblebee researcher Felicity Muth called the film "visually magnificent." Stephen Holden, writing for the New York Times, calls the cinematography "spectacularly beautiful," and calls the film "a fascinating but rambling documentary." Peter Bradshaw, writing for the Guardian, gave the movie three stars out of five and called it an "interestingly laidback film", opining that, "Imhoof seems disconcertingly untroubled" about the ecological challenges currently facing bees.  The film received an approval rating of 100% on Rotten Tomatoes based on 39 reviews, with a weighted average of 7.2/10. It also has a rating of 70% on Metacritic, based on 15 critics, indicating "Generally favorable reviews".

See also
 List of submissions to the 86th Academy Awards for Best Foreign Language Film
 List of Swiss submissions for the Academy Award for Best Foreign Language Film

References

External links
 Official website
 

2012 films
2012 documentary films
Swiss documentary films
2010s German-language films
Films directed by Markus Imhoof
Documentary films about bees
Documentary films about Switzerland